Newmania may refer to:
Newmania, a genus of moths in the family Anthelidae, considered synonymous with Anthela
Newmania (plant), a genus of plants in the family Zingiberaceae